Kosmos 351 ( meaning Cosmos 351), known before launch as DS-P1-Yu No.38, was a Soviet satellite which was launched in 1970 as part of the Dnepropetrovsk Sputnik programme. It was a  spacecraft, which was built by the Yuzhnoye Design Bureau, and was used as a radar calibration target for anti-ballistic missile tests.

Launch 
Kosmos 351 was launched from Site 133/1 at the Plesetsk Cosmodrome, atop a Kosmos-2I 63SM carrier rocket. The launch occurred on 27 June 1970 at 07:39:55 UTC, and resulted in the successful deployment of Kosmos 351 into low Earth orbit. Upon reaching orbit, it was assigned its Kosmos designation, and received the International Designator 1970-051A.

Orbit 
Kosmos 351 was the thirty-fourth of seventy nine DS-P1-Yu satellites to be launched, and the thirty-first of seventy two to successfully reach orbit. It remained in orbit until it decayed and reentered the atmosphere on 13 October 1970.

References

Kosmos satellites
Spacecraft launched in 1970
1970 in the Soviet Union
Dnepropetrovsk Sputnik program